WEC 31: Faber vs. Curran was a mixed martial arts (MMA) event held by World Extreme Cagefighting (WEC). The event took place on Wednesday, December 12, 2007 at the Hard Rock Hotel and Casino in Las Vegas, Nevada and was aired live on the Versus Network.

The main event featured a featherweight title match between champion Urijah Faber and challenger Jeff Curran.  The card also featured Doug Marshall defending his light heavyweight championship against Ariel Gandulla, Paulo Filho defending his middleweight championship against Chael Sonnen, and the WEC debut of former UFC Lightweight champion Jens Pulver.

Future WEC & UFC champion Dominick Cruz was scheduled to make his bantamweight debut against Charlie Valencia at this event, but was later forced from the card and replaced by Ian McCall. The Cruz/Valencia bout was rescheduled for WEC 34 the following June, where Cruz won by unanimous decision.

A featherweight bout between Chance Farrar and Micah Miller was originally slated for this event, but was pulled from the card three weeks beforehand after Farrar suffered a hand injury. The bout was instead rescheduled for WEC 32 two months later, where Miller won by knockout.

The event drew an estimated 629,000 viewers on Versus.

Results

Reported Payouts
The following is the reported payout to the fighters as reported to the Nevada State Athletic Commission. It does not include sponsor money or "locker room" bonuses often given by the WEC.

Urijah Faber: $40,000 (includes $20,000 win bonus) def. Jeff Curran: $10,000
Paulo Filho: $56,000 ($28,000 win bonus) def. Chael Sonnen: $25,000
Doug Marshall: $10,000 ($5,000 win bonus) def. Ariel Gandulla: $4,000
Jens Pulver: $60,000 ($30,000 win bonus) def. Cub Swanson: $5,000
John Alessio: $26,000 ($13,000 win bonus) def. Todd Moore: $4,000
Bryan Baker: $8,000 ($4,000 win bonus) def. Eric Schambari: $5,000
Ed Ratcliff: $8,000 ($4,000 win bonus) def. Alex Karalexis: $8,000
Brian Bowles: $6,000 ($3,000 win bonus) def. Marcos Galvao: $5,000
Charles Valencia: $12,000 ($6,000 win bonus) def. Ian McCall: $3,000

See also 
 World Extreme Cagefighting
 List of WEC champions
 List of WEC events
 2007 in WEC

External links
Official WEC website

References

World Extreme Cagefighting events
2007 in mixed martial arts
Mixed martial arts in Las Vegas
2007 in sports in Nevada
Hard Rock Hotel and Casino (Las Vegas)